Orbicula parietina is a species of fungus belonging to the Orbicula genus.  It was given its current name in 1951 by Canadian mycologist Stanley Hughes.  Originally, it was documented under the name Didymium parietinum in 1797 by German mycologist Heinrich Schrader (botanist).

References 

Pezizales
Fungi described in 1797
Taxa named by Heinrich Schrader (botanist)